Charles Raymond Keech (May 1, 1900 - June 15, 1929) was an American board track and brick track racer in the 1920s. He is best remembered for winning the 1929 Indianapolis 500, and for setting a land speed record.

Career

Land speed record
He set the record at the Daytona Beach Road Course in the 81-liter triple-engined internal combustion White Triplex 'Spirit of Elkdom'.

His record was broken by Henry Segrave on March 11, 1929. In 1929 Keech was asked by Triplex owner J. M. White to attempt to break the new record in the Triplex. Keech wisely declined. White hired Lee Bible, who rolled the car and died in his second attempt to set the record.

Automobile racing

He won the first race at the Michigan State Fairgrounds Speedway in 1928. He finished in second place in the season points in the AAA National Championship.

He qualified sixth for the 1929 Indianapolis 500. Louis Meyer was leading the race, until he lost oil pressure on lap 157. Keech passed for the lead as Meyer's engine refused to fire after he went to the pits to get more oil. Keech led the rest of the race.

Death
Keech died 16 days after his victory at Indianapolis in a racing accident at the Altoona 200-Mile Race in Tipton, Pennsylvania, on June 15, 1929. Rob Robinson ran over a hole in the track sending him into the wooden guardrail. The impact knocked the safety railing onto the track into oncoming traffic. Fellow competitor Cliff Woodbury swerving to avoid Robinson was struck by Keech who also tried to swerve out of the way then Keech hit the guardrail and flipped down the track bursting into flames, simultaneously, Keech was thrown clear of the car, but it rolled over him, crushing his head and tearing off one leg. He was killed instantly.

He was buried at the Hephzibah cemetery in Modena, Pennsylvania, in Chester County.

Indianapolis 500 results

External links

Indianapolis 500 career statistics 
Champ Car statistics
Motorsports Memorial

1900 births
1929 deaths
Indianapolis 500 drivers
Indianapolis 500 winners
Land speed record people
People from Coatesville, Pennsylvania
Racing drivers from Pennsylvania
Racing drivers who died while racing
Sports deaths in Pennsylvania